State Route 562 (SR 562) is an east–west highway in the Las Vegas Valley that comprises a portion of Sunset Road.

Route description

SR 562 begins at the intersection of Sunset Road and Las Vegas Boulevard (former SR 604/US 91/US 466). The highway heads east, skirting the southern edge of the McCarran International Airport runways, to an end at the city limits of Henderson at Annie Oakley Drive.

As part of I-15 south construction, an overpass was constructed for Sunset Road over I-15, which didn't exist previously. It is now continuous between Valley View Boulevard and Las Vegas Boulevard.

History
State Route 562 originally ran east to Boulder Highway (SR 582) in Henderson. By June 2002, the portion between Annie Oakley Drive and Gibson Road was relinquished to the City of Henderson, leaving two segments of SR 562. By 2017, the eastern segment had been turned over to local control.

Major intersections

Public transport
RTC Transit Route 212 functions on this road.

See also

References

562
Streets in the Las Vegas Valley